Sylwia is a given name. Notable people with the name include:

Sylwia Ejdys (born 1984), Polish middle-distance runner
Sylwia Gruchała (born 1981), Polish fencer
Sylwia Jaśkowiec (born 1986), Polish cross-country skier
Sylwia Julito (born 1929), Polish Olympic fencer
Sylwia Korzeniowska (born 1980), Polish race walker
Sylwia Nowak (born 1976), Polish ice dancer
Sylwia Parys (born 1988), Polish singer

See also
Sylvia (given name)